Dimitri Prochorow (born 16 September 1968) is a German weightlifter. He competed in the men's heavyweight II event at the 1996 Summer Olympics.

References

1968 births
Living people
German male weightlifters
Olympic weightlifters of Germany
Weightlifters at the 1996 Summer Olympics
Sportspeople from Saint Petersburg